This article provides details of international football games played by the England national football team from 2020 to present.

Results

2020

2021

2022

Forthcoming fixtures
The following matches are scheduled:

Head to head records

Notes

References

Football in England
England national football team results
2020s in English sport